Kharabat may refer to:

 Kharabat, Kabul, a district of Kabul in Afghanistan
 Kharabat (Persian), a term in Persian poetry and culture

See also 
 Kharabad, a village in Kerman Province, Iran